The five Sullivan brothers were World War II sailor brothers of Irish American descent who, serving together on the light cruiser , were all killed in action during and shortly after its sinking around November 13, 1942.

The five brothers, the sons of Thomas  (1883–1965) and Alleta Sullivan (1895–1972) of Waterloo, Iowa, were:

George Thomas Sullivan, 27 (born December 14, 1914), Gunner's Mate Second Class (George had been previously discharged in May 1941 as Gunner's Mate Third Class.)

Francis Henry "Frank" Sullivan, 26 (born February 18, 1916), Coxswain (Frank had been previously discharged in May 1941 as Seaman First Class.)

Joseph Eugene "Joe" Sullivan, 24 (born August 28, 1918), Seaman Second Class

Madison Abel "Matt" Sullivan, 23 (born November 8, 1919), Seaman Second Class

Albert Leo "Al" Sullivan, 20 (born July 8, 1922), Seaman Second Class

History

The Sullivans enlisted in the US Navy on January 3, 1942, with the stipulation that they serve together. The Navy had a policy of separating siblings, but this was not strictly enforced. George and Frank had served in the Navy before, but their brothers had not. All five were assigned to the light cruiser .

Juneau participated in a number of naval engagements during the months-long Guadalcanal Campaign beginning in August 1942. Early in the morning of November 13, 1942, during the Naval Battle of Guadalcanal, Juneau was struck by a Japanese torpedo and forced to withdraw. The torpedo likely hit the thinly armored light cruiser at or near the ammunition magazines and the ship exploded and quickly sank.

Captain Gilbert C. Hoover, commanding officer of the light cruiser , and the senior officer present afloat (SOPA) of the battle-damaged US task force, was skeptical that anyone had survived the sinking of Juneau and believed it would be reckless to look for survivors, thereby exposing his wounded ships to a still-lurking Japanese submarine. Therefore, he ordered his ships to continue on towards Espiritu Santo. Helena signaled a nearby US B-17 bomber on patrol to notify Allied headquarters to send aircraft or ships to search for survivors.

But in fact, approximately 100 of Juneaus crew had survived the torpedo attack and the sinking of their ship and were left in the water. The B-17 bomber crew, under orders not to break radio silence, did not pass the message about searching for survivors to their headquarters until they had landed several hours later. The crew's report of the location of possible survivors was mixed in with other pending paperwork actions and went unnoticed for several days. It was not until days later that headquarters staff realized that a search had never been mounted and belatedly ordered aircraft to begin searching the area. In the meantime, Juneaus survivors, many of whom were seriously wounded, were exposed to the elements, hunger, thirst, and repeated shark attacks.

Eight days after the sinking, ten survivors were found by a PBY Catalina search aircraft and retrieved from the water. The survivors reported that Frank, Joe and Matt were all killed instantly, Al drowned the next day, and George survived for four or five days, before suffering from delirium as a result of hypernatremia (though some sources describe him being "driven insane with grief" at the loss of his brothers); he went over the side of the raft he occupied. He was never seen or heard from again.

Security required that the Navy not reveal the loss of Juneau or the other ships so as not to provide information to the enemy. Letters from the Sullivan sons stopped arriving at the home and the parents grew worried, which prompted Alleta Sullivan to write to the Bureau of Naval Personnel in January 1943, citing rumors that survivors of the task force claimed that all five brothers were killed in action.

This letter was answered by President Franklin D. Roosevelt on January 13, 1943, who acknowledged that the Sullivans were missing in action, but by then the parents were already informed of their fate, having learned of their deaths on January 12. That morning, the boys' father, Tom, was preparing for work when three men in uniform – a lieutenant commander, a doctor and a chief petty officer – approached his door. "I have some news for you about your boys," the naval officer said. "Which one?" asked Tom. "I'm sorry," the officer replied. "All five."

The brothers left a sister, Genevieve (1917–1975). Al was survived by his wife Katherine Mary and son Jimmy. Joe left a fiancée named Margaret Jaros, while Matt left behind a fiancée named Beatrice Imperato. The "Fighting Sullivan Brothers" became national heroes. President Roosevelt sent a letter of condolence to their parents. Pope Pius XII sent a silver religious medal and rosary with his message of regret. The Iowa Senate and House adopted a formal resolution of tribute to the Sullivan brothers.

Tom and Alleta Sullivan made speaking appearances at war plants and shipyards on behalf of the war effort. Later, Alleta participated in the launching of a destroyer, named after her sons.

On Saturday, March 17, 2018, the wreckage of the USS Juneau was discovered by Microsoft co-founder Paul Allen off the coast of the Solomon Islands.

Legacy

As a direct result of the Sullivans' deaths (and the deaths of four of the Borgstrom brothers within a few months of each other two years later), the U.S. War Department adopted the Sole Survivor Policy.
A museum wing has been built in honor of their service in World War II. The museum is located in downtown Waterloo, Iowa, their hometown. It was completed in 2008. The grand opening occurred on November 15, 2008. The $11.5 million, state-of-the-art facility aims to play a role in preserving the history and service of Iowa veterans and serve as a facility for research and genealogy studies.
DD-537 was the first American Navy ship ever named after more than one person. The motto for both ships was/is "We stick together."
Al Sullivan's son served on board the first USS The Sullivans. His grandmother christened the first ship. The second USS The Sullivans was christened by Al's granddaughter Kelly Ann Sullivan Loughren.
Thomas and Alleta Sullivan toured the country promoting war bonds and asked that none of their sons died in vain.
Genevieve, their only sister, served in the WAVES. She was the girlfriend of Bill Ball, whose death while serving on the USS Arizona at Pearl Harbor prompted her brothers to join the Navy to avenge him.
The brothers' story was filmed as the 1944 movie The Sullivans (later renamed The Fighting Sullivans) and inspired, at least in part, the 1998 film Saving Private Ryan. The Sullivans were also briefly mentioned in Saving Private Ryan.
The brothers' hometown of Waterloo, Iowa, renamed its convention center in 1988 as "The Five Sullivan Brothers Convention Center". In June 2017, the city was considering a proposal to sell the center to a developer who would renovate the facility and change its name. The proposal met with some community opposition. The town also named a street and a public park in their honor. The park is the location of their childhood home.
The Sullivans were not the only brother sailors on board the ship. At least thirty sets of brothers served on the Juneau, including the three Rogers brothers from New Haven, Connecticut. Before the ill-fated Savo Island operation, two of the Rogers brothers were transferred to other commands. According to those who survived, had the ship returned to port safely, at least two Sullivans would have also transferred.
The Sullivan Brothers have a Department of Defense Dependents Schools elementary school in Yokosuka, Japan, named in their honor.
The song "Sullivan" by the alternative rock band Caroline's Spine tells the story of the Sullivans.
The Sullivans Association, an organization of veterans who served on both US Navy ships named after the brothers, conducted a reunion on September 25, 2011, in Waterloo, Iowa. The attendees gathered at Sullivans Park, visited Calvary Cemetery and laid flowers at the graves of the Sullivan brothers' parents and sister, and visited the neighborhood where the family had lived.

See also

Bixby letter
Borgstrom brothers
Brothers von Blücher, German brothers also killed in a single day
Niland Brothers
Sole Survivor Policy

Notes

References

External links

USS The Sullivans DDG 68
Naval Historical Center 
Lost and Found Sound: The Stories Only known audio recording of the Sullivan Brothers.

Letter of Mrs Sullivan to the Bureau of Naval Personnel & Reply of president Franklin Roosevelt
Sullivan Brothers Iowa Veterans Museum

United States Navy personnel killed in World War II
People from Waterloo, Iowa
Sibling groups
United States Navy sailors
1942 deaths
20th-century births
Missing in action of World War II